Donald Howard Pullen (born April 16, 1991), known professionally as Rockie Fresh, is an American rapper. He was signed to Rick Ross' Maybach Music Group and Atlantic Records. Pullen is known for his alternatively influenced style of hip-hop, and his associations with recording artists Patrick Stump of Fall Out Boy, and Joel & Benji Madden of Good Charlotte.

Career
In 2009, Rockie began recording his debut mixtape Rockie's Modern Life in a small recording studio Chicago, Illinois.  During the recording process, he met Andrew Koenig & Andrew Gertler, who began to manage him. The trio released Rockie's Modern Life in December 2009, and followed it up with another mixtape, The Otherside, recorded at Studio 11 in December 2010.

The success of the projects earned Rockie widespread acclaim from hip-hop blogs and publications, and performances across the country including one at Bamboozle Festival, where he met Josh Madden, who would later introduce Rockie to his brothers Joel & Benji Madden of Good Charlotte. Rockie's music also grabbed the attention of Fall Out Boy lead-singer Patrick Stump, whom Rockie has cited as a major influence and has since toured with.

Since the release of The Otherside Rockie has been named one of Metromix's "25 Hottest Artists Under 25" and his music has been featured on The CW's nationally syndicated television show Nikita. He was also featured on Good Charlotte's project The Madden Brothers: Before The Fame according to Rolling Stone and Billboard magazines.

In 2012, Rockie released his mixtape Driving 88, which led to his signing with Rick Ross' Maybach Music Group on July 12 via Atlantic Records. After his signing, he released his fifth mixtape and debut Maybach Music Group project 'Electric Highway'. It features guest appearances from Lunice, Rick Ross, Nipsey Hussle, Curren$y and others. Production is handled by The Gift, Boi-1da, The Maven Boys and others. He has also since appeared on Rick Ross "The Black Bar Mitzvah" mixtape, amongst other Maybach Music Group collaborations and remixes.

On April 29, 2013, Rockie Fresh released a seven-track project in celebration of his birthday, aptly titled 'The Birthday Tape'. Featuring vocal appearances from his MMG members Rick Ross and Gunplay. Shortly thereafter, he announced an endorsement deal with shoe & apparel brand PUMA. Compilation album Self Made Vol. 3 from MMG got released on September 16, 2013. Rockie Fresh made appearances on 4 tracks on the album and on two more tracks on the Best Buy deluxe edition. On December 16, 2013, Rockie Fresh and Casey Veggies collaboration mixtape "Fresh Veggies" got released. It is presented by PUMA and released under Maybach Music Group and Peas N' Carrots International. The mixtape features vocal appearances from Overdoz, Ty Dolla $ign, Juicy J, Kirko Bangz and Hit-Boy. "Fresh Veggies" was produced by Lunice, Jahlil Beats and Hit-Boy, among others. Fresh was nominated for the 2014 XXL freshman class, but didn't make the final cut.

On October 23, 2018, Rockie Fresh announced his signing to Rostrum Records. He also released his new single "No Satisfaction" via a Billboard Magazine announcement.

Discography

Studio albums 
2019: Destination

Collaborative albums

Mixtapes

Singles

Guest appearances

Music videos

As lead artist

As featured artist

References

1991 births
Living people
American hip hop musicians
Rappers from Chicago
21st-century American rappers
African-American male rappers
21st-century American male musicians
21st-century African-American musicians